Jason Arnaz Brookins (born January 5, 1976) is a former professional American football running back who played one season for the Baltimore Ravens of the  National Football League. He played college football at Lane College in Jackson, Tennessee.

References

External links
 Green Bay Packers profile
 NFL Europe profile

1976 births
Living people
American football running backs
Baltimore Ravens players
Montreal Alouettes players
Green Bay Packers players
Jacksonville Jaguars players
Lane Dragons football players
Rhein Fire players
People from Mexico, Missouri
Players of American football from Missouri